Atttadappa is a small village in the Kannur district of Kerala. The village has a co-operative bank branch. There are 2 L.P schools and 1 U.P School in this village. There is a primary Health Center in this village. Edakkad, which is a tourist place is also near to this. Edakkad is famous for its beach.

Thalassery road, Kannur